Bad Kissingen is a German spa town in the Bavarian region of Lower Franconia and seat of the district Bad Kissingen. Situated to the south of the Rhön Mountains on the Franconian Saale river, it is one of the health resorts, which became famous as a "Weltbad" in the 19th century. In 2021, the town became part of the transnational UNESCO World Heritage Site under the name "Great Spa Towns of Europe", because of its famous mineral springs and its architecture exemplifying the popularity of spa resorts in Europe during the 18th through 20th centuries.

History 
The town was first documented in the year 801 under the name chizzicha and was renowned above all for its mineral springs, which are recorded from as early as 823. At that time, Kissingen was under the domination of Fulda Abbey, later it fell to the Counts of Henneberg and was sold to the bishops of Würzburg in the 14th century. Kissingen was first mentioned as "oppidum" (town) in 1279. The town developed to a spa in the 1500s and recorded its first official spa guest in 1520. In 1814, Kissingen became part of Bavaria. The town grew to be a fashionable resort in the 19th century, and was extended during the reign of Ludwig I of Bavaria. Crowned heads of state such as Empress Elisabeth of Austria, Tsar Alexander II of Russia and King Ludwig II of Bavaria, who bestowed the 'Bad' on Kissingen in 1883, were among the guests of the spa at this time. Other well-known visitors to the resort included author Leo Tolstoy, composer Gioachino Rossini and artist Adolph von Menzel.

On 10 July 1866, during the Mainfeldzug (campaign at the river Main) of the Austro-Prussian War, Kissingen was the site of fierce battle between Bavarian and Prussian troops, which ended with a Prussian victory.

Imperial Chancellor Otto von Bismarck visited Kissingen's spas many times, and in 1874 in the course of the Kulturkampf he survived an assassination attempt by the catholic Eduard Franz Ludwig Kullmann there. In 1877 the Kissingen Dictation (German: Kissinger Diktat) was written here, in which Bismarck explained the principles of his foreign policy. Bismarck's former home in Kissingen is now the Bismarck Museum. In June 1911 Alfred von Kiderlen-Waechter, German Secretary of State, and the French ambassador Jules Cambon had negotiations in Bad Kissingen about Morocco without achieving a solution. The failure of the negotiations lead to the Agadir Crisis.

The resort's clientele changed in the 20th century, with ordinary people increasingly replacing nobility as guests. The spa suffered a one-year interruption in 1945, the only closure in its history.

Shortly prior to World War II Manteuffel Kaserne (Manteuffel barracks) was established at the eastern edge of the Bad Kissingen town center by the German military as part of Hitler's program to expand the German Wehrmacht. In 1945, the American army entered the town peacefully and took over the Kaserne, which was renamed Daley Barracks in 1953. The barracks were closed in the 1990s after the fall of the iron curtain when the American troops were withdrawn.

After the war, the Department of Social Security built clinics in the town. A change in health legislation in the 1990s reduced the opportunities for German health insurance contracts to fund spa visits, which led to job losses. As a result, efforts were made to attract a new kind of clientele, helped in no small part by the EMNID survey which named Bad Kissingen Germany's best-known spa town.

In 2015, about 1.5 million overnight stays of more than 238,000 visitors were registered in the town. With the opening of the KissSalis Therme in February 2004, Bad Kissingen gained a spa leisure centre and, in December 2004, the German-Chinese Football Academy was opened in the town, where the Chinese "08 Star Team" lived and trained in preparation for the Olympic Games in Beijing in 2008.

Spa 
There are 7 mineral springs in Bad Kissingen, all of which are still used today. All but the Schönborn spring are cold, containing high levels of sodium, carbonates, and sulphates. The springs are located in the Kissingen-Haßfurt fault zone, absorbing minerals from Permian-era sediment layers. 
 
Bad Kissingen was one of the leading spas in the 19th and early 20th century, which in German are called "Weltbad". They differ from other spa resorts mainly through the following criteria:
 Entertainment: The social life in a "Weltbad" is at least as important as the medical cure, or even more. A "Weltbad" offered many opportunities for the spa guests to spend their free time, such as exercise and sports, trips to the surroundings, theater and concert, library and games.
 Guests: The "Weltbad" was attractive to guests from all five continents. Particular attention was paid to prominent visitors, who attracted more visitors, especially from nobility and upscale middle class.
 Architecture: There are spa quarter, quarters with villas, areas for business and care, gardens and parks with a smooth transition into the surrounding landscape
 Infrastructure and supply: Despite the small number of inhabitants, a "Weltbad" offered the guests all the contemporary comfort, which was not even common in all major cities. These include good transport connections, communication facilities (such as telegraphy and telephone on the latest state of the art), luxury goods offer, differentiated hotel and gastronomy as well as state-of-the-art technology for energy supply, water supply and sanitation.

Geography

Subdivision 
In addition to the main town of Bad Kissingen, its districts include (with population numbers given in brackets, as of 1 January 2011):
 Albertshausen (624)
 Arnshausen (1,244)
 Bad Kissingen (11,003)
 Garitz (4,557)
 Hausen (1,704)
 Kleinbrach (375)
 Poppenroth (876)
 Reiterswiesen (2,103)
 Winkels (1,378)

Governance

Mayors 
 Franz Meinow (1910–1947): 1945–1946
 Franz Rothmund (1873–1954): 1946–1947
 Karl Fuchs (1881–1972): 1947–1952
 Hans Weiß (1919–2008): 1952–1984
 Georg Straus (1926–2014): 1984–1990
 Christian Zoll (1941–2017): 1990–2002
 Karl Heinz Laudenbach (born 1957): 2002–2008
 Kay Blankenburg (born 1957): 2008–2020
 Dirk Vogel (born 1977): since 2020

Town Council 
The Council of Bad Kissingen (2020–2026), elected on 15 March 2020:
 The mayor Dirk Vogel (Social Democratic Party of Germany, SPD)
 9 members of the Christian Social Union of Bavaria (CSU)
 6 members of the (SPD)
 4 members of the Demokratische Bürger Kissingen (DBK, local group)
 3 members of the Freie Wähler party, (Free voters)
 4 members of the Bürger für Umwelt (BfU) /Alliance 90/The Greens /ödp
 2 members of the Alternative for Germany (AfD)
 1 member of the Left Party
 1 member of the Zukunft Bad Kissingen (local group)

In May 2020, three members of the CSU changed to DBK. Since then, the CSU has had 6 members in the town council, the DBK seven.

Twin towns – sister cities

Bad Kissingen is twinned with:
 Eisenstadt, Austria (1978)
 Massa, Italy (1960)
 Vernon, France (1960)

Arts and culture

Museums 
 Bismarck-Museum in the Obere Saline (upper saltworks)
 Permanent exhibition: Jewish life in the former Jewish school
 Cardinal-Döpfner-Museum in Hausen

Music 
 The classical music festival Kissinger Sommer with participation of internationally well known orchestras and soloists is a highlight of the cultural calendar. 
 Kissinger Piano Olympics (Klavierolymp), a competition of young pianistes, related to the Kissinger Sommer, is held in autumn.
 Another music festival called the Kissinger Winterzauber takes place each winter. 
 The national German brass band contest has been hosted in Bad Kissingen in 2014 and 2016.

Other regular events 
 The annual festivity Rakoczy Festival at the last weekend of July is held to honour all historical figures whose lives were connected to Bad Kissingen. The highlight is a parade on the Sunday afternoon. Historical figures are represented by citizens of the town during the entire weekend, and take part in town life.
 The Kissinger Kabarettherbst is a series of performances of cabaret artists in autumn.

Architecture 
The ruins of castle Bodenlaube from 1180 overlook the town from above. The old town hall is a Renaissance design from 1577. The town hall of today is the former mansion of the noble family von Heußlein, built by Johann Dientzenhofer in 1706. The medieval chapel Marienkapelle was renewed and enlarged by Balthasar Neumann. The catholic parish church Herz-Jesu-Kirche (Church of the Sacred Heart of Jesus) was built in neo-gothic style in 1882 by Andreas Lohrey. The tower is 67 meters high. The Jakobuskirche (Church of St. James) was the old catholic parish church of Bad Kissingen. The tower dates back to the 14th century, the church – replacing a medieval predecessor – was built from 1772 to 1775 by Johann Philipp Geigel in classicist style. The Lutheran church Erlöserkirche (Church of the Savior) was erected in 1847 according to the plans of the architect Friedrich von Gärtner, and expanded in 1891 according to the plans of August Thiersch. The Russian Orthodox Church of Saint Sergius of Radonesh, consecrated in 1901, was designed by the tsar's architect Viktor Schröter (St. Petersburg) in a neo-byzanthine style and erected by the architect Carl Krampf (Kissingen) for the then very numerous Russian spa guests. The Anglican Church of 1862 for the British spa guests was sold to the Lutheran community in 1953. The dilapidated building was replaced by the Lutheran community center in 1968.

Between 1838 and 1913, the arcade (Arkadenbau) was built around the spa garden by Friedrich von Gärtner, as well as the halls for the use of the mineral water ("Brunnenhalle") and for promenades ("Wandelhalle"), following a design by Max Littmann. Littmann also designed the Kurtheater (spa theatre), completed in 1905, and the concert hall Regentenbau, inaugurated in 1913. The train station building, with its Renaissance revival façade, was built in 1874 under the supervision of Friedrich Bürklein. The KissSalis Therme was opened in 2004. It is one of the largest wellness baths in Europe, and the largest building project in the town since World War II.
Another point of interest is the casino in the spa park.

Other architectural sites in Bad Kissingen include:
 Bismarck Monument (Bad Kissingen)
 Bismarck Tower (Bad Kissingen)
 Ludwig Tower (Bad Kissingen)
 Wittelsbacher Tower (Bad Kissingen)

Sports 
Bad Kissingen boasts a large number of sports clubs and types of sports:
 Football
 1. FC 06 Bad Kissingen 
 TSV Reiterswiesen
 TV “Vater Jahn” Bad Kissingen-Winkels 
 Post SV Bad Kissingen 
 TSV gg Kissingen-Hausen 
 SV Bad Kissingen-Garitz 
 SV Bad Kissingen-Arnshausen 
 FC Viktoria Bad Kissingen-Poppenroth
 Tennis
 TC Rot Weiss Bad Kissingen
 TSV Bad Kissingen
 Golf (Club founded in 1910; golf-course opened in 1911 by Louis Botha, Prime Minister of South Africa)
 Fencing
 Basketball
 Swimming
 Ice hockey
 Flying
 Judo
 Chess
 Shooting
 Shooting club “Edelweiss” Reitersweisen (Bavarian league air pistol 2005/2006)
 Horse riding

World Cup 2006 
During the World Cup 2006, Bad Kissingen was home to the Ecuador national team (the Croatia team was in Bad Brückenau). Sports facilities and infrastructure were upgraded for the team.

Education 

 Sinnberg-Grundschule; elementary school

 Anton-Kliegl-Mittelschule; secondary school
 Staatliche Realschule Bad Kissingen; secondary school

 Jack-Steinberger-Gymnasium; grammar school, named after Jack Steinberger (a German-American physicist and Nobel Prize Winner)
 Berufschule Bad Kissingen; vocational school
 Franz-von-Prümmer-Schule; special school

Notable people 

 Jeff Baker (born 1981), MLB infielder on the Miami Marlins
 Otto von Botenlauben (1177–1245), Count of Henneberg, minnesinger and crusader
 Claus-Frenz Claussen (born 1939), otolaryngologist
 Julius Döpfner (1913–1976), cardinal and archbishop of München and Freising
 Trong Hieu (born 1992), Vietnam Idol winner 2015
 Baptist Hoffmann (1863–1937), operatic baritone and voice teacher
 Cyrill Kistler (1848–1907), composer, music educator and music publisher
 Henry Kissinger's great great grandfather, Meyer Löb, derived his name from Bad Kissingen in 1817
 Anton Kliegl (1872–1927), inventor of the Klieg light
 Oskar Panizza (1853–1921), physician and writer
 Hanna Ralph (1888–1978), stage and film actress
 Philipp Schmitt (1902–1950), SS commandant of Nazi prison camp executed for war crimes
 Jack Steinberger (1921–2020), physicist and Nobel Prize winner

See also
 Neurootological and Equilibriometric Society
 Wichtelhöhlen (Bad Kissingen)

Footnotes

External links

 

The Town That's Building Life Around Sleep

 
Spa towns in Germany
Bad Kissingen (district)